Hal Haig "Harry" Prieste (November 23, 1896 – April 19, 2001) was an Armenian-American athlete who participated in the 1920 Summer Olympics in Antwerp as a diver.

Biography
He was born Haig Prieste in Fresno, California to Armenian immigrant parents. Their original surname was Keshishian. "Haig" is the name of the progenitor of the Armenians.  Prieste first took "Harry" as his American name, but later switched to "Hal."

He won a bronze medal in platform diving as a member of the 1920 US Olympic team.  He also competed in the 1920 plain high diving event, but was eliminated in the first round.

He is known for taking the original five-interlocking-ring Olympic flag as a prank at the 1920 Summer Olympics hosted by the city of Antwerp, Belgium. At the end of the Games, the flag could not be found. In 1997, at a banquet hosted by the US Olympic Committee, a reporter was interviewing him and the reporter mentioned that the IOC had not been able to find out what had happened to the original Olympic flag. "I can help you with that," Prieste said matter-of-factly, "It's in my suitcase." At the end of the Antwerp Olympics, spurred on by team-mate Duke Kahanamoku, he climbed a flagpole and stole the Olympic flag. For 77 years the flag was stored away in the bottom of his suitcase. The flag was returned to the IOC by Prieste, by then 103 years old, in a special ceremony held at the 2000 Summer Olympics in Sydney. At the handover, IOC president Juan Antonio Samaranch gave him a commemorative Olympic medal in a box, to which the hard-of-hearing Prieste responded, "What is it? Kleenex?" The Antwerp Olympic Flag is now on display at the Olympic Museum in Lausanne, Switzerland, with a plaque thanking him for donating it.

At the time of his death at 104, Prieste was the world's oldest former Olympic medalist, and the first known Olympian whose lifespan covered three centuries (1896–2001).

References

External links
 New York Times article
 Profile of Hal Haig Prieste

1896 births
2001 deaths
American people of Armenian descent
American centenarians
Divers at the 1920 Summer Olympics
Olympic bronze medalists for the United States in diving
Sportspeople from Fresno, California
American male divers
Medalists at the 1920 Summer Olympics
Men centenarians